Deerfield Media, Inc. is a broadcasting company and a shell corporation owned and operated by Stephen P. Mumblow. It was established on December 1, 2012 by the acquisition of several television stations connected to the Sinclair Broadcast Group. Most of its stations are part of duopolies with another Sinclair-owned station, and are operated under local marketing agreements or similar by Sinclair.

As a part of its acquisition of multiple stations from Newport Television in Cincinnati and San Antonio, Sinclair sold WSTR-TV and KMYS (MyNetworkTV and The CW affiliates respectively) to Deerfield, and also gave them an option to purchase WJTC and WPMI at a later date. Deerfield Media also acquired KBTV-TV, a Fox affiliate in Beaumont, Texas, from Nexstar Broadcasting Group, whose operations were assumed by Sinclair's KFDM. Through an option exercised by Sinclair, Deerfield also acquired WUTB, a MyNetworkTV affiliate owned by Fox Television Stations. This purchase created a triopoly between Sinclair's Fox affiliate, WBFF, and CW affiliate, WNUV (owned by Cunningham Broadcasting, and also operated under an LMA by Sinclair). Deerfield also reached a deal to acquire the license assets of WHAM-TV, an ABC affiliate in Rochester, New York, also from Newport Television, and to acquire KAME-TV, the MyNetworkTV affiliate in Reno, Nevada, from Ellis Communications on February 1, 2013 as part of Sinclair's purchase of KRXI-TV from Cox Media Group.

In April 2018, Deerfield Media moved its headquarters from New York City to Park City, Utah.

2021 FCC fine 
On July 28, 2021, the Federal Communications Commission (FCC) issued a Forfeiture Order against Deerfield Media related to the lawsuit DirecTV, LLC v. Deerfield Media, Inc., ordering the company to pay 6 fines of $512,228 each, totaling $3,073,368. The order was the result of a lawsuit filed by DirecTV and its parent AT&T alleging that Deerfield Media, along with several other station groups whose stations are managed by Sinclair Broadcast Group, failed to negotiate for retransmission consent in good faith for its stations KBTV, KMYS, WHAM, WJTC, WPMI, and WSTR. The FCC adopted a Memorandum Opinion and Order and Notice of Apparent Liability on September 2, 2020 affirming the lawsuit allegations. The stations affected by the fines were represented in retransmission negotiations by Duane Lammers of Max Retrans.

Current stations 
Stations are arranged alphabetically by state and by city of license.

K36PL (branded as Park City Television) and K34QB (branded as TV8 Vail) are operated directly by Deerfield Media with no involvement from Sinclair Broadcast Group.

See also 
 Cunningham Broadcasting
 Howard Stirk Holdings
 Duopoly (broadcasting)
 Mission Broadcasting and White Knight Broadcastingsimilar holding companies related to Nexstar Media Group

References 

2012 establishments in New York City
Mass media companies established in 2012
Sinclair Broadcast Group
Television broadcasting companies of the United States